The Fast Freight is a 1922 American comedy film starring Fatty Arbuckle. The film was not released in the US, due to Arbuckle's involvement in the Virginia Rappe scandal. The film is considered to be lost. The film is also known as Via Fast Freight, Handle with Care and Freight Prepaid.

Cast
 Roscoe 'Fatty' Arbuckle as Ras Berry
 Lila Lee as Elsie
 Nigel Barrie as John Hammond
 Herbert Standing as Peter Hammond
 Raymond Hatton

See also
 List of American films of 1922
 Fatty Arbuckle filmography

References

External links

1922 films
1922 lost films
1922 comedy films
Silent American comedy films
American black-and-white films
Films directed by James Cruze
American silent feature films
Lost American films
Lost comedy films
1920s American films